The Men's +100 kg powerlifting event at the 2004 Summer Paralympics was competed  on 27 September. It was won by Faris Abed, representing .

Final round

27 Sept. 2004, 17:15

References

M